Andros Town Airport or Andros Town International Airport  is an airport serving Andros Town on Andros Island in the Bahamas. It is also known as Fresh Creek Airport.

It is one of three commercial airports on Andros Island. The airport is served by one airline, but few tourists actually fly there. The airport is like any small Bahamian airport, with check-in, customs, gift shops and restaurants.

Facilities

Airlines and destinations

References

External links
 
 

Airports in the Bahamas
Andros, Bahamas